The Walther P5 is a 9mm semi-automatic pistol developed in the mid-1970s by the German small arms manufacturer Carl Walther GmbH Sportwaffen. It was designed with the German police forces in mind, who sought to replace existing 7.65mm pistols with a modern service sidearm incorporating enhanced safety features and chambered in 9×19mm Parabellum. A subsequent bid resulted in the Walther P5 being introduced into service alongside the SIG Sauer P225 (designated P6 within the West German Federal Police) and Heckler & Koch P7.

Design details
The pistol incorporates many new design features, including a new aluminum alloy frame, trigger mechanism, dual-control mechanism, firing pin safety (US patent number 4313274 dated 1979, authored by Walter Ludwig).

The Walther P5 is a recoil-operated, locked-breech, 9 mm semi-automatic pistol. It utilizes the same design principles as the Walther P38 pistol of World War II fame. This system results in a very accurate pistol since the barrel is kept parallel with the frame during/after firing. The trigger is a standard double-action/single-action trigger. The slide lock also doubles as the decocker and is found on the left side of the frame. Pressing it once will release the slide, pressing it a second time will safely de-cock the hammer.

Manufactured in Ulm, West Germany, by Carl Walther Sportwaffen GmbH, the P5 was a further development of the famous Walther P38 and P1 series. Development began following requests by German police and federal agencies for a new sidearm. Walther engineers decided to use the P1 model as the basis of the P5 and gave it a similar locking system, reinforced frame, and dual recoil springs. In addition, the Walther improved the extractor, shortened the barrel, and increased the slide length. Safety was enhanced by utilizing an innovative pivoting firing pin that can move forward only when the trigger is pulled. In addition, the P1's slide-mounted decocker/safety was moved to a frame mounted decocker/slide stop multi-lever.

Unlike most modern semi-automatic pistols, the P5 ejects spent casings to the left.  This may make it a more attractive firearm for left-handed shooters.

Variants

Walther P5 Compact

The Walther P5 Compact is the shorter and lighter version of the full-size P5. Approx 6,500 units were made for the commercial market with the "P5 Compact" slide marking.

Walther P5 Lang

Walther P5 Lang - also known as P5L -  is a variant with an extended barrel whose shape is reminiscent of that of the P38.

Reception

Although the P5's successful and functional design and high level of functional reliability were confirmed by experts, there was no great sales success within Germany nor for export. As such, while successor of the P38, the P5's popularity limited compared to its predecessor.
Reason for this is believed to be its high price.

Domestically, only the police of Baden-Württemberg and Rhineland-Palatinate procured the standard model in 9x19mm between 1976-1979. The compact version were issued to few criminal police departments in Baden-Württemberg. Due to pricing, the SIG Sauer P225 generally outbid Walther P5 in the domestic law enforcement sales.

3,000 units of Walther P5 Compact were adopted in the 1980s by the British Army as Pistol L102A1 and were marked as such with the British military model number on the left side and NATO number on the right side instead of the standard Walther model markings. They were issued to the Royal Irish Regiment (Home Service) as a Personal Protection Weapon, also a small number may have been issued to 14 Intelligence Company, a unit active in Northern Ireland.

Unknown variant of Walther P5 was utilized by the 39th Special Forces Detachment "Detachment A" of the US army, which was part of Berlin Brigade during Cold War.

Users

: Standard version was adapted by police of Baden-Württemberg and Rhineland-Palatinate. Compact version adopted by criminal police departments in Baden-Württemberg.
: Standard issue firearm of the Dutch police until 2013 when it was replaced by the Walther P99Q.

: Detachment A / 39th Special Forces Operational Detachment. Various police forces. 
: British Army; P5 Compact as Pistol L102A1 (see above)

References

External links

 Walther P5 instruction manual
 Walther P5 spare parts drawing
  Walther P5 Compact spare parts drawing
 Walther P5 at Modern Firearms

7.65×21mm Parabellum semi-automatic pistols
9mm Parabellum semi-automatic pistols
9×21mm IMI semi-automatic pistols
Cold War weapons of Germany
Police weapons
Short recoil firearms
Walther semi-automatic pistols